Faramir  is a fictional character in J. R. R. Tolkien's The Lord of the Rings. He is introduced as the younger brother of Boromir of the Fellowship of the Ring and second son of Denethor, the Steward of Gondor. 
Faramir enters the narrative in The Two Towers, where, upon meeting Frodo Baggins, he is presented with a temptation to take possession of the One Ring. In The Return of the King, he leads the forces of Gondor in the War of the Ring, coming near to death, succeeds his father as Steward, and wins the love of Éowyn, lady of the royal house of Rohan.

Tolkien wrote that of all his characters, Faramir was the most like him: Tolkien had fought in the First World War and had similarly had a vision of darkness. Scholars have likened Faramir's courage to that in the Old English poem The Battle of Maldon, and his hunting green-clad in Ithilien to the English folk hero Robin Hood. The Tolkien scholar Jane Chance sees Faramir as central to a complex web of Germanic allegiance-relationships. 

Faramir has been the subject of illustrations by John Howe, Ted Nasmith and Anke Eißmann. He was voiced by Andrew Seear in the BBC's 1981 radio adaptation. He was played by David Wenham in Peter Jackson's film trilogy.

Narrative

Background 

Faramir was the son of Denethor, who became steward of Gondor a year after Faramir's birth. His mother was Finduilas, daughter of Prince Adrahil of Dol Amroth; she died when Faramir was five, and was to him "but a memory of loveliness in far days and of his first grief". After her death Denethor became sombre, cold, and detached, but the relationship between Faramir and his elder brother Boromir, who was five years older, only grew closer, even though Denethor openly favoured Boromir. Faramir was used to giving way and not airing his own opinions. Faramir displeased his father by welcoming the wizard Gandalf to Minas Tirith, Gondor's capital. Faramir, eager for knowledge, learned much from Gandalf about Gondor's history.

Faramir looked much like Boromir, who is described as "a tall man with a fair and noble face, dark-haired and grey-eyed, proud and stern of glance". In Faramir, "by some chance the blood of Westernesse [ran] nearly true". He did not enjoy fighting for its own sake.  

Gondor had long been threatened by the nearby realm of Mordor, and in 3018 (when Faramir was 35) the Dark Lord Sauron began the War of the Ring, attacking the ruined city of Osgiliath that guarded the river crossing to Minas Tirith. Faramir and Boromir commanded the defence.

Shortly before the battle, Faramir had a prophetic dream, in which a voice spoke of the "Sword that was Broken" that was to be found at Imladris far to the north, about the awakening of "Isildur's Bane", the approach of "Doom", and the appearance of "the Halfling". Faramir decided to journey to Imladris and seek the advice of Elrond the Half-elven, but Denethor sent Boromir instead.

The Two Towers 

Faramir first encountered the hobbits Frodo Baggins and Samwise Gamgee in Ithilien, and recognized them to be the Halflings mentioned in his dreams. Faramir questioned Frodo about his quest, and Frodo revealed that he, along with eight other companions including Boromir, had set out from Rivendell. During the interrogation, Faramir asked often about Boromir, since he knew, as Frodo did not, that Boromir was already dead. One night, Faramir had waded down to the Anduin after seeing a boat there. It contained the dead body of his brother, who had been killed by Orcs after Frodo had left the group. Frodo tried to avoid the subject of his quest, but Faramir realised that Frodo was carrying something important to Sauron. Sam accidentally spoke of Boromir's desire for the One Ring, thus revealing what Frodo was carrying. Faramir then showed the crucial difference between him and his proud brother:

Faramir was wise enough to know that such a weapon was not to be used. He saw how his brother had been tempted beyond his strength, and wished that he had gone on the quest himself. He gave the Hobbits provisions and sent them on their way, warning Frodo that their guide, Gollum, was treacherous, and that an unknown terror lived on the pass of Cirith Ungol, where Gollum was leading them.

The Return of the King 

The following evening, Faramir sent his company to reinforce the garrison at Osgiliath, while he and three men rode to Minas Tirith. They were pursued by the Nazgûl. Faramir rode back to help the fallen and was rescued by Gandalf. At Minas Tirith, Faramir reported to Denethor and Gandalf that he had met Frodo and Sam. Denethor became angry that Faramir had let them go to Mordor with the Ring, instead of bringing it to him.

The Witch-king of Angmar, leader of the Nazgûl, led a large army from Minas Morgul, and seized Osgiliath. Faramir stayed with the rearguard, and was gravely wounded. The city's cavalry brought him back to Minas Tirith, and the Battle of the Pelennor Fields began. Denethor believed the unconscious Faramir to be fatally injured. He had a funeral pyre built for himself and Faramir. The Hobbit Pippin Took, sworn into Denethor's service, alerted Gandalf, and Faramir was rescued from the flames. Mad with grief, Denethor jumped onto the pyre, burning himself alive.

After the battle, Aragorn healed Faramir with athelas in the Houses of Healing. Recuperating, Faramir met the Lady Éowyn of Rohan, and fell in love with her. At first, Éowyn refused his advances, only desiring to find honour in death. But soon she loved him in return. Faramir became Steward, and prepared the city for the arrival of Aragorn, now King of Gondor. On the day of the coronation, Faramir surrendered his Stewardship. Aragorn, however, renewed the office, announcing that as long as his line lasted, Faramir's descendants would be Stewards of Gondor. He made Faramir Prince of Ithilien. In addition, as Steward Faramir served as the King's chief counsellor and ruled Gondor when the King was absent. With Éowyn, he settled in Ithilien, among the hills of the Emyn Arnen; they had a son named Elboron. After Faramir's death at the age of 120, his son succeeded him. Barahir, Faramir's grandson, wrote The Tale of Aragorn and Arwen, said in the frame story to have been inserted in the Thain's Book by the writer Findegil.

Analysis

Medieval influences 

The Tolkien scholar Elizabeth Solopova states that Faramir's decision to reject the One Ring shows influences from a kind of courage and behaviour that was known to Tolkien from the medieval poem The Battle of Maldon. By not taking the Ring, Faramir rejects the desire for power and glory which a defeat of Sauron would bring him.

The medievalist Marjorie Burns sees a sign of Englishness, "a Robin Hood touch", in the green-clad Faramir and his men hunting the enemy in Ithilien.

The Tolkien scholar Jane Chance analyses Faramir's place in what she identifies as an elaborate web of relationships based on a medieval Germanic worldview. Firstly, she describes Faramir and Boromir as a pair of opposites, good and evil brothers, which she likens to Theoden and Denethor whom she considers a pair of good and evil "Kings". Secondly, she explores what she sees as a series of parallel instances of feudal allegiance (a man's oath of service to his lord, in return for protection) and betrayal (the breaking of that oath) involving Faramir and Frodo. Sam serves Frodo faithfully, but accidentally betrays him to Faramir with the smoke from his cooking fire and then by mentioning the Ring. Gollum's allegiance to Frodo is in the form of an oath sworn on the Ring, to obey Frodo and not to run off. Frodo "betrays" Gollum by luring him into the captivity of Faramir's men. Gollum then swears to Faramir that he will never return to the forbidden pool. The last of the parallel allegiance relationships is that Faramir grants Frodo protection, in the manner of a Germanic lord, and in return Frodo offers his service. Thirdly, after the War of the Ring, society is renewed as Aragorn marries Arwen, bringing the races of Man and Elf together, while in parallel to that Faramir marries Éowyn, bringing together the nations of Rohan and Gondor.

Tolkien's personal experiences 

Tolkien's biographer John Garth, in his book Tolkien and the Great War: The Threshold of Middle-earth, writes that the resemblance between Faramir and the author, which Tolkien admitted in a letter ("As far as any character is 'like me', it is Faramir"), was that the two men were both soldiers and scholars, Faramir having "a reverence for the old histories and sacred values that helps him through a bitter war." Tolkien served as an officer in the British Army during the First World War, fighting in the Battle of the Somme in 1916. Tolkien bestowed his dream of "darkness unescapable" on Faramir, who narrates the dream to Éowyn. Of this, Tolkien wrote, "when Faramir speaks of his private vision of the Great Wave, he speaks for me. That vision and dream has been ever with me — and has been inherited (as I only discovered recently) by one of my children, Michael."

The scholar of literature Melissa A. Smith suggests that Tolkien's First World War experience of war brides may be reflected in Faramir's brief courtship of Éowyn. She notes that Tolkien wrote in response to criticism that "In my experience feelings and decisions ripen very quickly (as measured by mere 'clock-time', which is actually not justly applicable) in periods of great stress, and especially under the expectation of imminent death". Smith adds that Tolkien indeed married Edith Bratt just before he was posted to the Western Front in France.

Development 

In The History of The Lord of the Rings, Christopher Tolkien recorded that his father had not foreseen the emergence of Faramir during the writing of the book, only inventing him at the actual point of his appearance in The Two Towers. Tolkien himself noted that the introduction of Faramir had led to postponement of the book's dénouement and to further development of the background for Gondor and Rohan.

In early drafts, Tolkien had used the familiar forms thou and thee to show a sudden shift in the relationship between Faramir and Éowyn, a "deliberate change to a form of affection or endearment". Christopher Tolkien comments that

Portrayal in adaptations

Art 

Faramir appears in several illustrations created by John Howe, Ted Nasmith and Anke Eißmann for The Lord of the Rings and related products. One of the scenes from the book that received many depictions is Faramir and Éowyn's meeting at the top of Minas Tirith.

Radio 

In the BBC's 1981 radio adaptation of The Lord of the Rings, Faramir is voiced by Andrew Seear.  The radio drama adhered faithfully to the books, and Peter Jackson gave the adaptation credit in the production of his film trilogy.

Film 

In Rankin/Bass' 1980 adaptation of The Return of the King, a dark-haired man taken to be Faramir is shown next to Éowyn in greeting Aragorn as he arrives to Minas Tirith.

In Peter Jackson's The Lord of the Rings film trilogy, Faramir is played by David Wenham. The actor jokes that he got the role because he and Sean Bean, who played Boromir, both had large noses. The plot of the second film, The Lord of the Rings: The Two Towers, introduces a significant deviation from the book: Faramir does not at first let Frodo, Sam, and Gollum go, but decides to bring them and the Ring to Gondor. He takes them to Osgiliath and not until the Nazgûl attack the city and Frodo comes under the threat of capture does he release them. Jackson's explanation is that he needed another adventure to delay Frodo and Sam, because the episode at Cirith Ungol was moved to the third film, and so a new climax was needed. On the timeline given by Tolkien, Frodo and Sam had only reached the Black Gate at the time of the fall of Isengard. Jackson argues that it was necessary for Faramir to be tempted by the Ring because in his films everyone else was tempted, and letting Faramir be immune would seem inconsistent to a film audience. Jackson's portrayal of the Rangers' treatment of Gollum, who is beaten up, and Faramir's implicit compliance, have been criticised. In the book, Faramir calls the creature Sméagol instead of Gollum, and tells his men to "treat him gently, but watch him".

In the extended edition of The Two Towers, Jackson included an invented flashback scene in which Denethor neglects Faramir in favour of Boromir when sending him to Rivendell, so that Faramir wanted to please his father by bringing him the Ring. (The relationship is similarly strained in the book, but his father's favouritism does not seem to affect his decisions in Ithilien.) Reviewers have opined that the extended edition presents Faramir in a more favourable light.

Video games 

Faramir is a bonus playable character in the video game The Return of the King. In a bonus video track within this game, Wenham says that "Faramir and Boromir were brothers, and it isn't beyond possibility that Faramir would have gone to Rivendell instead. And if that happened, Faramir could have survived and returned to Gondor."

Namesakes 

The International Astronomical Union names all colles (small hills) on Saturn's moon Titan after characters in Tolkien's work. In 2012, they named a hilly area "Faramir Colles" after Faramir.

Notes

References

Primary 
This list identifies each item's location in Tolkien's writings.

Secondary

Sources 

 
 
 
 
 
 
 

Fictional military captains
Fictional princes
Fictional swordfighters
Literary characters introduced in 1954
Middle-earth Dúnedain
The Lord of the Rings characters